An aisle is a space for walking with rows of seats on both sides or with rows of seats on one side and a wall on the other.

Aisle may also refer to:

 Aisle (political term), the divide between two political parties
 Aisle (video game), an interactive fiction game released in 1999
 Aisle (company), a Canadian manufacturer of reusable menstrual products